Martensius is an extinct genus of caseid synapsid from the Early Permian of Germany. The type species is Martensius bromackerensis.

References 

Prehistoric synapsid genera
Caseasaurs